Ezeiza may refer to:

 Ezeiza, Buenos Aires, a city in Buenos Aires Province, Argentina
 Ezeiza Partido, in Buenos Aires Province, Argentina
 Ministro Pistarini International Airport, known as Ezeiza International Airport
 Gabino Ezeiza, Argentine musician